José María Álvarez-Pallete López (born 12 December 1963, Madrid) is a Spanish economist and chief executive officer of Telefónica S.A. since 8 April 2016.

Professional career 
José María Álvarez-Pallete began his professional career at Arthur Young Auditors in 1987, before joining Benito & Monjardín/Kidder, Peabody & Co. in 1988. After this, in 1995, he joined the Compañía Valenciana de Cementos Portland (CEMEX) as head of the Investor Relations and Analysis Department.

In 1996, he was promoted to Chief Financial Officer in Spain, and in 1998 to Chief Administration and Finance Officer of the CEMEX Group Indonesia and to member of the Board of CEMEX Asia Ltd.

In February 1999, he joined the Telefónica Group as de of Telefónica Internacional SA, and on September of that same year he took up the post of Managing Director of the Corporate & Finance in Telefónica S.A.
In July 2002, he was appointed Executive Chairman of Telefonica International S.A., in July 2006, Managing Director of Latin America Telefonica, and in March 2009, President of Latin America Telefonica.
In September 2011, he was promoted to chief executive officer (CEO) of Telefónica Europe; at that time, he developed Wayra, the accelerator of Startup Company in Latin America and Spain.

He is Managing Director of Telefónica S.A. since 17 September 2012, and he became also a member of the Administrative Board of Telefónica S.A. in July 2006. In addition to this, he is a member of the Executive Committee of Telefónica.

On 20 March 2016, César Alierta left the position of chief executive officer (CEO) of Telefónica S.A. and named José Maria Álvarez-Pallete as his successor, who took up the CEO position on 8 April 2016,

Since March 2019 he is member of the Advisory Council of SEAT, S.A.

In January 2022, he was appointed president of the GSM Association (GSMA) succeeding the president of Orange, Stéphane Richard. 

In February 2022, José María Álvarez-Pallete assumes the presidency of Fundación Telefónica, replacing César Alierta.

Other activities

Corporate boards
 Endeavor, Member of the Board of Directors
 Portugal Telecom, Member of the Board of Directors (2008–2010)

Non-profit organizations
 Elcano Royal Institute for International and Strategic Studies, Member of the Board of Trustees
 European Round Table of Industrialists (ERT), Member
 Museo Nacional Centro de Arte Reina Sofía, Member of the Board of Trustees

Awards and recognition 

 2001 – Best “CFO Europe Best Practices” award in the Mergers & Acquisitions category for the year 2000  
2003 –  Member of Merit at the Ibero-American Forum of the Fundación Carlos III 
2007 – Master of Gold of the High Direction Forum 
 2011 – Economics Person of the Year, awarded by the journal El Economista 
2013 – Received the Excellence 2013 Award, for his contribution to the development of telecommunications, granted by the Spanish Telecommunication Engineers Association
 2014 – Sorolla Medal, awarded by the Hispanic Society of America 
 2014 – Innovative Corporate Leader of the Year, awarded by the Latin Trade Magazine 
 2014 – Most Creative People, listed by Fast Company Magazine 
2016 – The Consejo Superior de Deportes granted him the entry in the Royal Order of Merit Sports in the category of Bronze Medal  
2017 – Forbes magazine recognized José María Álvarez-Pallete as the best CEO of companies that quoted in Spain in 2016 
2019 – He received the "Manager of the Year" award in the Large Corporations category granted by the Asociación Española de Directivos 
2019 –  He received the "Executive of the Year" award in the second edition of the awards for economic, social and business excellence by Merca2 
2019 – “Business Leader of the Year” by the Spain-US Chamber of Commerce 
2020  – ECOFIN prize for "Financiero del Año" 
2020 – "Lider Empresarial Impulsor del Marketing" by the Spanish Marketing Association 
2022 – He received the award "Mejor Empresario del Año" from Actualidad Económica, economic supplement of El Mundo.

See also 

 Telefónica
 Daniel Escoda Villacorta

References

1963 births
Living people
Spanish economists
Spanish chief executives
Complutense University of Madrid alumni
Directors of Telefónica